The following is a list of repetiteurs from the Balanchine Trust authorized to stage ballets of George Balanchine.

 

Karin von Aroldingen
Merrill Ashley
Robert Barnett
Paul Boos
Elyse Borne
Maria Calegari
John Clifford
Bart Cook
Daniel Duell
Suzanne Farrell
Judith Fugate

Nanette Glushak
Susan Hendl
Darla Hoover
Sandra Jennings
Jillana
Zippora Karz
Sean Lavery
Sara Leland
Adam Luders
Miriam Mahdaviani
Nilas Martins
Philip Neal

Colleen Neary
Patricia Neary
Susan Pillarre
Christine Redpath
Lisa de Ribere
Francia Russell
Suki Schorer
Joysanne Sidimus
Bettijane Sills
Victoria Simon
Diana White
Deborah Wingert

Ballet-related lists
Balanchine Trust repetiteurs, List of